Darren Lowe may refer to:
Darren Lowe (ice hockey) (born 1960), Canadian player and coach
Darren Lowe (lacrosse) (active 1989-2000), American player